Enrique Míguez (born 4 March 1966) is a Spanish sprint canoer who competed from the mid-1980s to the early 1990s. Competing in three Summer Olympics, he won a bronze medal in the C-2 500 m event at Los Angeles in 1984.

References

External links
 

1966 births
Canoeists at the 1984 Summer Olympics
Canoeists at the 1988 Summer Olympics
Canoeists at the 1992 Summer Olympics
Living people
Olympic canoeists of Spain
Olympic bronze medalists for Spain
Spanish male canoeists
Olympic medalists in canoeing
Medalists at the 1984 Summer Olympics
20th-century Spanish people